The Boston mayoral election of 1888 saw the election of Thomas N. Hart, who defeated incumbent mayor Hugh O'Brien.

Results

See also
List of mayors of Boston, Massachusetts

References

Mayoral elections in Boston
Boston
Boston mayoral
19th century in Boston